Gorenci may refer to:
 Gorenci, Vrbovsko, a village in Vrbovsko, Croatia
 Gorenci, Centar Župa, North Macedonia
 Gorenci, Debarca, North Macedonia

See also 
 Goranci (disambiguation)